Freziera varibrateata is a species of plant in the Pentaphylacaceae family. It is endemic to Bolivia.

References

Endemic flora of Bolivia
varibrateata
Critically endangered plants
Taxonomy articles created by Polbot